Acleris alnivora is a species of moth of the family Tortricidae. It is found in Russia, China, Japan and Taiwan.

The wingspan is about 22 mm.

The larvae feed on Alnus japonica var. rufa and Ulmus propinqua.

References

	

Moths described in 1956
alnivora
Moths of Asia